John Wilson Young Smith (March 18, 1869 – November 3, 1936) was a Canadian politician. He served in the Legislative Assembly of New Brunswick from 1892 to 1895 as an independent member. He died in 1936.

References 

1869 births
1936 deaths